Ewald Theodor Alfred Bosse (4 April 1880 – 22 September 1956) was a Swedish-Norwegian sociologist and economist.

He was born in Stockholm as a son of bookseller and publisher Johan Heinrich Wilhelm Bosse (1836–1896) and Anne-Marie Lehmann (1834–1894). He was a brother of Alma Fahlstrøm and Harriet Bosse.

He took the doctorate in Kiel in 1914 on the thesis Norwegens Stellung im internationalen Wirtschaftsleben vom 16. Jarhundert bis zur Gegenwart. He was a professor in Kiel from 1920 to 1926 and 1948 to his death. He died in September 1956 in Oslo.

References

External links
 
 

1880 births
1956 deaths
Swedish emigrants to Norway
Norwegian sociologists
Norwegian economists
Academic staff of the University of Kiel
Norwegian expatriates in Germany